{{DISPLAYTITLE:C5H4}}
The molecular formula  (molar mass: 64.09 g/mol, exact mass: 64.0313 u) may refer to:

 3-Ethynylcycloprop-1-ene
 1,4-Pentadiyne
 Penta-1,2-dien-4-yne
 Spiropentadiene, or bowtiediene

Molecular formulas